Sednaya Prison ( Sajn Ṣaydnāyā) is a military prison near Damascus in Syria operated by the Syrian government. The prison has been used to hold thousands of prisoners, both civilian detainees and anti-government rebels. The Syrian Observatory for Human Rights (SOHR) estimates that 30,000 detainees have perished in Sednaya from torture, ill-treatment and mass executions since the outbreak of the Syrian Civil War, while Amnesty International estimated in February 2017 "that between 5,000 and 13,000 people were extrajudicially executed at Saydnaya between September 2011 and December 2015."

Overall, human rights organizations have identified over 27 prisons and detention centers run by Assad's regime around the country where detainees are routinely tortured and killed. A defector from Assad's sources smuggled out tens of thousands of photographs from these prisons, showing the bodies of those who had been murdered. The defector stated that he had personally photographed the dead and that archives of thousand more such photographs of other victims existed.

A former inmate of the prison who was detained for participating in a peaceful non-violent protest told Amnesty International that at Sednaya prisoners were forced to choose between dying themselves or killing one of their own relatives or friends. The former inmate also stated that in the first prison he was at, prisoners were also forced into cannibalism, but that prison was "heaven" compared to Sednaya Prison. According to the inmate, the other prison (Branch 215) was "to interrogate" (including through torture), but when that was done, you were moved to Sednaya "to die". In 2017, the US State Department alleged that a crematorium had been built at the prison to dispose of the bodies of the executed, although Amnesty's investigation did not find evidence of this having happened.

About the Sednaya Prison
There are different social groups who are at risk. These can be groups of labourers, business people, students, bloggers, university professors, lawyers, doctors, activists defending the rights of minority groups, people helping their neighbours or journalists. Detainees may be either men, women or even children.

The prison consists of two buildings with a total of 10,000–20,000 detainees and is under the jurisdiction of the Minister of Defense while operated by the Military Police. Detainees have usually spent months or years in detention elsewhere before being transferred to Sednaya. It was not until after the 2011 crisis when this started to happen. The way in which detainees are being transferred to this facility has been internationally recognized and criticized, mainly by Amnesty International. The transfers usually take place after holding unfair trials at a secret military court. In interviews with Amnesty, prisoners described the trials as sham for lasting only one to three minutes. While some prisoners would be told they were being transferred to a civilian prison when they instead were to be executed, other detainees do not even get to see a judge.

Recognized unfair trials

The Syrian Mus’ab al-Hariri belonged to the banned organization, the Muslim Brotherhood, and lived in exile in Saudi Arabia until his return to Syria in 2002 with his mother. She worried that their return would cause problems for her son because of his political stand but the Syrian Embassy in Saudi Arabia had assured her that this would not happen. However, shortly after al-Hariri's return, he was sentenced by the Syrian Security forces on 24 July 2002. At the time of arrest, he was only 14 years old. Even though the UN Working Group on Arbitrary Detention announced al-Hariri's detention as arbitrary, the authorities took no step to amend his situation. The UN Working Group based its announcement on their assessment that he did not receive a fair trial. Four main issues that were raised were his young age when arrested, that he had been held in isolation for more than two years, reportedly tortured and that he was sentenced by the SSSC (Supreme State Security Court) in June 2005 to six years in prison despite no substantial evidence. All the SSSC knew was that al-Hariri belonged to the banned Muslim Brotherhood.

The Syrian Human Rights Committee reported in 2004 about people being arrested the same year because of political reasons. To offer the suspected individuals human rights defenders and lawyers was not self-evident and as in the case of Mus’ab al-Hariri, hundreds of prisoners remained in long detention without trial or following sentences enforced after unfair trials. It was also reported that no respect was given to the poor health condition of prisoners and that these were still held in rigorous conditions.

The 2008 Massacre

According to The Syrian Human Rights Committee, the military police changed all the locks of the prison cells on the night of 4 July 2008. On the day after a search operation was launched through all the prisons quarters, in which the security guards trampled on copies of the Quran. The act triggered fury among Muslim detainees who rushed to collect the Quran copies. The guards opened fire and killed nine of the prisoners. Among the nine killed prisoners, they were able to identify eight of them, those were: Zakaria Affash, Mohammed Mahareesh, Abdulbaqi Khattab, Ahmed Shalaq, Khalid Bilal, Mo’aid Al-Ali, Mohannad Al-Omar and Khader Alloush. Clashes have been reported after this incident where the total number of victims reached 25 detainees. However, the committee could not ascertain their identities.

Testimonies

These testimonies are collected from three different sources. Two documentaries and a series of articles.
The Black Box: The Death in Sednaya by Al Jazeera, The Road to Sednaya: We have Changed, Omar Abdullah by Orient News, and Sednaya Death speaks, Zaman Alwasl Newspaper.
According to many detainees, in 2005 Ali Kher Bek became the director of the prison and he was very strict and harsh with detainees. He worsened their life conditions by halting visits and cutting electricity on the prison for a long period of time.

Diab Serriya, a former detainee, had been accused of forming a youth opposition group. He was arrested in 2006 and released in 2011 after a general amnesty. “ We had the feeling that the prisoners would rebel in any moment because the living situation was unbearable.”  Diab said that on 26 March 2008, a fight broke between a prisoner and a security guard, which led to Ali Kher Bek's rage. On the next day he walked, with other security forces, through the prison shouting at the prisoners and insulting them. He visited all the dungeons of the prison. The security forces dragged prisoners in charge of all the prison's wards and punished them. Some detainees kept shouting “Allah Akbar” and banging on the metal doors. A rebellion broke out and the prison went out of control.

Serriya told Zaman Alwasel Newspaper that security forces used tear gas and opened fire in the air to intimidate prisoners, who most of them ran to the roof and started to burn blankets, plastic bags and wooden pieces, to send a message that the prison was in chaos and urgent helped was needed. When the security forces could not exert control over the prison, the government launched negotiations with the prisoners, through which it agreed on providing fair trials for detainees, allowing family visits again, enhancing the living conditions, increasing the daily breaks's time, improving the quality of beverage and drinks, providing a proper medical care, in addition to immediate change for the unfair treatment of the prisoners. This incident was known as “The first Rebellion” and lasted for one day.

After this incident the prison went into loose policy. The internal doors were left open all the time, prisoners started to defy the security forces, and lenient treatment was obvious.,. The effect of “the first rebellion” had lasted till 5 July 2008 when the director launched an offensive to discipline the prisoners. Many fights broke between the prisoners and the military police until prisoners overpowered them. In addition to exerting control over the whole prison, and retaining more than 1245 out of 1500 from military police. From the outer fence of the prison, security forces opened fire and killed the first group, which attempted to flee the prison due to the unbearable situations. The group was: Wael al-Khous, Zakaria Affash, Daham Jebran, Ahmed Shalaq, Mohammed Abbas, Hassan Al-Jaberie, Mohammed Eld Al-Ahmad, Khader Alloush, Abdulbaqi Khattab, Maen Majarish and Mo’aid Al-Ali. Fearing suffocation of the tear gas and the running from the bloody scenes inside the building, the prisoners dragged some of the hostages to the roof so they can communicate with the military forces outside and find a way out of the dilemma. However, the governmental forces opened fire and killed almost 30 military police hostages and some prisoners who were with them. In addition to 10 hostages were killed by the prisoners and 6 committed a suicide out of fear to be killed by the prisoners.
After a long battle, military reinforcements from the capital arrived to Sednaya and laid siege around the prison. Some tried to break in but in vain. After 10 days of negotiation, the government agreed on a
evacuating the injured who faced torture in Tishreen hospital and 6 of them died under torture there. The government promised to punish the perpetrators and told the prisoners that the director of Tishreen hospital was fired. It also improved the quality of the beverage. During this time prisoners released the hostages. And better treatment has appeared but not for long.

Reactions to the massacre

While Sarah Leah Whitson, Director of the Middle East and North Africa human rights said: “President Bashar al-Assad should immediately order an independent investigation into the police's use of lethal force at Sednaya prison”, SANA, the Syrian official news agency, issued a short press release on July 6, stating that "a number of prisoners…incited chaos and breached public order in the prison and attacked other fellow prisoners…during an inspection by the prison administration." The agency reported that the situation required "the intervention of the unit of guards to bring order to the prison." Ammar al-Qurabi the director of the National Organization for Human Rights commented on SANA's release by asking to form a committee of activists which can visit the detainees and ascertain their conditions and he confirmed that the number of prisoners in Sednaya was between 1500 and 2000. 200 of them had Islamic backgrounds and most of them participated in the Iraq war. Al-Qurabi called to investigating the massacre's perpetrators and announcing the investigation's result. Also, he asked for enhancing the living conditions and the medical care of the detainees.

Other human rights abuses

The Sednaya prison massacre was not the only incident of human rights abuses in the prison's history. Other examples range from particular testimonies of people who had been incarcerated in Sednaya to organized leaks and research done on the topic.
Omar al-Shogre, a Syrian teenager has testified that he had gone through 11 Syrian prisons during his several years of imprisonment. Sednaya was the final one. He had described the events in Sednaya as beginning with a "welcome party" during which new inmates were beaten with "metal parts from a tank". In Shogre's case, one officer beat ten newly arrived inmates. He states that "for 15 days [he] couldn't open [his] eyes or get up". After a month in Sednaya, Shogre was taken to a trial under the accusations for terrorism. The trial, he says, lasted for 5 seconds. He contracted tuberculosis there and witnessed what he thinks is an occurrence of "organ harvesting". Sednaya had come into the public eye when the 2014 Syrian detainee report, also known as the Caesar report got unveiled. It was authored by the legal team consisting of The Right Honourable Sir Desmond De Silva QC, the former Chief Prosecutor of the Special Court for Sierra Leone, Professor Sir Geoffrey Nice QC, the former lead prosecutor of ex-President Slobodan Milošević of Yugoslavia, before the International Criminal Tribune for the former Yugoslavia, and Professor David M. Crane, the first Chief Prosecutor of the Special Court for Sierra Leone, with the help of a forensic team. The legal and forensic teams came to the conclusion that the photos Caesar took were credible, and that they clearly showed "signs of starvation, brutal beatings, strangulation, and other forms of torture and killing." While the most of the 55,000 photos encompassing around 11,000 victims from the report are from other detention facilities in Damascus, some of them are also from the Sednaya prison. Prisoners were also often transferred between different facilities: some detainees were transferred to Sednaya from the Mezze Air Force Branch, while others were taken from Sednaya to Tishreen. In early 2017 the Sednaya Military Prison again came into the public eye when an Amnesty International report was released on February 7. The report, the result of the research conducted by Amnesty International which took place between December 2015 and December 2016, raises a plethora of accusations against the Syrian regime. It alleges that the regime has at its highest instances, authorized the killings of thousands of people in the Sednaya prison since 2011. After interviewing 84 people, out of which 31 were former detainees, Amnesty International has concluded that the regime has implemented systematic torture in Sednaya. One former detainee, Salam, a lawyer from Aleppo described the torture process:

"The soldiers will practice their 'hospitality' with each new group of detainees during the 'welcome party'… You are thrown to the ground and they use different instruments for the beatings: electric cables with exposed copper wire ends – they have little hooks so they take a part of your skin – normal electric cables, plastic water pipes of different sizes and metal bars. Also, they have created what they call the 'tank belt', which is made out of tyre that has been cut into strips... They make a very specific sound; it sounds like a small explosion. I was blindfolded the whole time, but I would try to see somehow. All you see is blood: your own blood, the blood of others. After one hit, you lose your sense of what is happening. You're in shock. But then the pain comes."

Another former detainee is Samer al-Ahmed who, on a regular basis, was forced to squeeze his head through the small hatch near the bottom of his cell door. It was then straightened out by the prison guards when they, with all their weight, jumped on his head. This required that al-Ahmed's head was pressed against the edge of the hatch. The guards would continue the torture until blood started flowing across the floor.

Torture methods in Sednaya varied. One common interrogation technique called shabeh was described by one of the witnesses: "They had me stand on the barrel, and they tied the rope around my wrists. Then they took away the barrel. There was nothing below my feet. They were dangling in the air. They brought three sticks… [They were] hitting me everywhere… After they were done beating me with the wooden sticks, they took the cigarettes. They were putting them out all over my body. It felt like a knife excavating my body, cutting me apart." Other methods of torture consisted of leaving people in stress positions while beating them or torturing them with electricity.

The detainees were also deprived of food and water, and had been raped and forced to rape each other. One of the testifications states: "They beat me until I was lying on the ground and then they kicked me with their military boots, in the places where I have had my hip operations, until I passed out. When I woke up, I was back in the solitary cell – they had dragged me back there from that room – but my trousers had been opened and moved down a bit, my abaya [full-length robe] was open and my undershirt was moved up. Everything was hurting, so I couldn't tell if I had been raped. It was overwhelming pain everywhere."
When they did get food, it was often mixed with blood. Amnesty International has managed to confirm the names of 375 individuals executed in Sednaya prison, and while the UN Office of the High Commissioner for Human Rights and Human Rights Watch, suggests that tens of thousands of detainees have died in Sednaya and other government-run detention centers since 2011 as a result of the extermination policies, Amnesty International itself calculates the number of deaths to between 5,000 and 13,000.

The Syrian Justice Ministry denied the report issued by Amnesty International, describing it as "devoid of truth" and considering it to be a part of a smear campaign targeted against Syrian government. The Syrian Justice Ministry holds a view that motivation for the allegations to smear the Syrian government's international reputation come from recent "military victories against terrorist groups".

After the 2011 uprisings
After months of anti-Government protests in 2011, many prisoners, including secular and Islamist detainees, were released in several amnesties. Zahran Alloush, Abu Shadi Aboud (brother of Hassan Aboud) and Ahmed Abu Issa were some of the more prominent prisoners released from the prison. After their release, many took up arms against the regime and became leaders of Islamist rebel groups including Jaysh al-Islam, Ahrar ash-Sham and Suqour al-Sham Brigade in the Syrian Civil War.

There have repeatedly been reports on inhumane conditions for detainees in Sednaya (as well as other Syrian prisons), ranging from torture and malnutrition to spontaneous executions without fair trials.

Amnesty's reconstruction of Sednaya Prison

The lack of accessibility to reports from journalists and monitoring groups have made reliable information about the prison very difficult to find. The only available sources on the incidents inside the Sednaya prison derive from the memories of former detainees. In April 2016, Amnesty International and Forensic Architecture traveled to Turkey to meet five Sednaya survivors. The researchers used architectural and acoustic modeling to reconstruct the prison and the survivors’ experiences at detention. As there are no images of the prison and because the prisoners were held in darkness under strictly enforced silence, researchers had to depend entirely on their memories and acute experience of sound, footsteps, door opening and locking and water dripping in the pipes among other things. The fact that prisoners rarely saw daylight, they were, consequently, forced to develop an acute relation to sound. Having to cover their eyes with their hands whenever a guard entered the room made them become attuned to the smallest sounds. In a video interview, a former Sednaya detainee says "You try to build an image based on the sounds you hear. You know the person by the sound of his footsteps. You can tell the food times by the sound of the bowl. If you hear screaming, you know newcomers have arrived. When there is no screaming, we know they are accustomed to Sednaya." Sound became the instrument by which inmates navigated and measured their environment. Therefore, sound also became one of the essential tools with which the prison could be digitally reconstructed. The sound artist Lawrence Abu Hamdan used a technique of “echo profiling” which made it possible for him to decide the size of cells, stairwells, and corridors. He played different sound reflections and asked former inmates to match these tones of different decibel levels to the levels of specific incidents inside the prison.

Based on these testimonies and with the help of an architect working with 3D modeling software, Amnesty and Forensic Architecture have constructed a model on the entire prison. As they remembered, the witnesses added objects like torture tools, blankets, furniture, and areas where they recalled them being used. In Sednaya, the architecture of the prison emerges not only as a location of torture but itself as an instrument in its perpetration. Forensic Architecture's project on Sednaya is part of a larger campaign run by Amnesty International. The project aims to pressure the Syrian government to allow independent monitors into the detention centres. Amnesty urged Russia and the United States to use their power to admit independent monitors to investigate conditions in Syria's torture prisons.

Crematorium accusations
On May 15, 2017, the United States Department of State accused the Syrian government of engaging in mass executions at the prison, and burning the bodies of the executed in a crematorium built in Sednaya Prison in an effort to conceal the killings. According to the State Department a crematorium was constructed with the purpose of hiding the evidence of the thousands murdered at the prison. The State Department "released commercial satellite photographs showing what it described as a building in the prison complex that was modified to support the crematorium. The photographs, taken over the course of several years, beginning in 2013, do not prove the building is a crematorium, but show construction consistent with such use." Evidence suggesting crematorium use includes 2015 photographs showing all buildings at the complex covered in rooftop snowmelt except for a single building (suggesting "a significant internal heat source") as well as a discharge stack, a likely firewall, and a likely air intake. The State Department, in a later press briefing, agreed that snowmelt on the roof presented as one of the pieces of evidence "consistent with a crematorium" could possibly just indicate it is a warmer part of a building.

Acting assistant secretary of state for the Middle East Stuart E. Jones stated that as many as 50 prisoners a day were killed in mass hangings. Jones stated: "Although the regime's many atrocities are well documented, we believe that the building of a crematorium is an effort to cover up the extent of mass murders taking place in Sednaya prison."

Amnesty International, who had interviewed former guards and inmates of the prison, have remarked that none of them have told them about the existence of the crematorium. According to other escapees of the prison, the bodies were buried outside of the compound.

Former inmates
Zahran Alloush, former leader of Jaysh al-Islam
Hassan Aboud, former leader of Ahrar ash-Sham
Abu Yahia al-Hamawi, former leader of Ahrar ash-Sham
Abu Jaber Shaykh, senior leader of Tahrir al-Sham
Ahmed Abu Issa, leader of Suqour al-Sham Brigade
Abu Mohammad al-Adnani, former leader and spokesperson of Islamic State of Iraq and the Levant (ISIL)
Abu Luqman, former ISIL governor of Raqqah
Haitham al-Maleh, Islamist opposition activist and lawyer
Jihad Qassab, former footballer who was executed on 30 September 2016
Hassan Soufan, former leader of Ahrar al-Sham from 2017 to 2018 and the general commander of the Syrian Liberation Front.
Omar Alshogre, Director of Detainee Issues at Syrian Emergency Task Force

References

External links

"Inside Saydnaya: Syria's Torture Prison ." Amnesty International at YouTube. August 18, 2016.
 

Prisons in Syria
Torture in Syria
Syrian civil war crimes